The 1940 Kansas Jayhawks football team represented the University of Kansas in the Big Six Conference during the 1940 college football season. In their second season under head coach Gwinn Henry, the Jayhawks compiled a 2–7 record (0–5 against conference opponents), finished in last place in the conference, and were outscored by opponents by a combined total of 183 to 75. They played their home games at Memorial Stadium in Lawrence, Kansas.

The team's statistical leaders included Ed Hall with 294 rushing yards, 251 passing yards, and 27 points scored (four touchdowns and three extra points), and Don Pollom with 158 receiving yards. Don Pierce was the team captain.

Schedule

References

Kansas
Kansas Jayhawks football seasons
Kansas Jayhawks football